Mareko is one of the woredas in the Southern Nations, Nationalities, and Peoples' Region of Ethiopia. This woreda is named after the Mareko people. Part of the Gurage Zone, Mareko is bordered on the southwest by the Silt'e Zone, on the northwest by Meskane, and on the east by the Oromia Region. Mareko was part of the former Meskanena Mareko woreda. The administrative center of this district is Koshe.

Demographics 
Based on the 2007 Census conducted by the CSA, this woreda has a total population of 64,512, of whom 32,730 are men and 31,782 women; 6,880 or 10.67% of its population are urban dwellers. The majority of the inhabitants were reported as Muslim, with 84.02% of the population reporting that belief, while 7.98% practice Ethiopian Orthodox Christianity, and 7.41% were Protestants.

Notes 

Districts of the Southern Nations, Nationalities, and Peoples' Region